Mohammad Pakpour   is a Brigadier-General and Commander of the Islamic Revolutionary Guard Corps Ground Forces since 2009.

History 
Mohammad Pakpour was involved with the IRGC at the beginning of the Islamic Revolution in the Kurdistan Province and was a veteran of the 8-year-long Iran–Iraq War. His responsibilities include five years of Army Operations Command, commander of the 8th Najaf Division, commander of 31st Ashura Division of Command chief Army's Northern Command headquarters. Pakpur has a PhD in Political Geography and has had responsibility for measures such as fighting terrorism in the northwest of Iran and establishing sustainable security in the southeast region of Iran, as well as the holding of specialized exercises.

During a maneuver in Iran, he asserted that the IRGC wants to promote the security of the region and the abilities of armed forces and to demonstrate new tactics in military operations. He expressed that drones like Hemaseh help to keep the Islamic Revolutionary Guard Corps on their toes and shows the consistency and preparedness of the force.

U.S. sanctions 
On 24 June 2019, the U.S. Treasury Department sanctioned him, freezing any of his U.S. assets and banning U.S. persons from doing business with him.

References 

Living people
Recipients of the Order of Fath
Islamic Revolutionary Guard Corps brigadier generals
Islamic Revolutionary Guard Corps personnel of the Iran–Iraq War
1961 births
Iranian individuals subject to the U.S. Department of the Treasury sanctions